Papin is a surname, and may refer to:

Christine Papin (1905–1937), French murderer
Denis Papin (1647 – c. 1712), French physicist, mathematician and inventor
Jean-Pierre Papin (born 1963), French former football player
Joseph Papin (1825–1862), lawyer and political figure in Canada East
Lea Papin (1911–1982), French murderer
Steve Papin (born 1972), American football player
Theophile Papin (ca. 1858-1916), American, known as the "squire of debutantes"
 
It may also refer to:
Papin, Missouri

See also

Papen
Pappin
 Papain, a proteolytic enzyme from papaya